Oxford High School is a public high school in Oxford, Massachusetts. The school is operated by the Oxford Public Schools district. Before the new building on Carbuncle Drive, the original Oxford High on Main Street was designed in 1906 by the architecture firm Cutting, Carleton & Cutting.

Curriculum
Oxford High offers three levels of courses for its students: college and career prep (CCSP), honors (H), and Advanced Placement (AP). For the latter, the school offers AP courses in biology, calculus, English literature, and United States history. All students are required to complete four years of English, mathematics, and physical education, as well as three years of social studies and science and two years of either Spanish or French.

The school offers extracurricular activities such as skiing, band, theater, and chorus, as well as a Gay-Straight Alliance, which focuses on the acceptance of all community members. Additionally, there is a Junior Reserve Officers' Training Corps program that is affiliated with the United States Navy.

Athletics
Athletic teams at Oxford High are named the Pirates. The school offers sports including: baseball, basketball, cheerleading, cross country, field hockey, football, golf, soccer, softball, track and field, and volleyball.

Notable alumni
 Carla Berube (1993), college basketball player and coach
 Tom Herrion (1985), college basketball coach
 Tony Reno (1993), college football coach
 Etta Riel (1932), disappeared person

See also
 List of high schools in Massachusetts

References

External links
Official website

Schools in Worcester County, Massachusetts
Public high schools in Massachusetts